Rene Cailliet, M.D., (June 10, 1917 - March 14, 2015) was an American physician of French ancestry best known for a very popular series of books on musculoskeletal medicine.

Personal life
Rene Cailliet was born in Philadelphia on June 10, 1917. He was the son of Lucien Cailliet (May 27, 1897 – January 3, 1985), the French born American composer, conductor, arranger, clarinetist, and creator of music for films. After graduation from Medical School at the University of Southern California in 1943, he served in the U.S. Army during the Second World War. After the war he was one of the pioneering physicians who developed Physical Medicine and Rehabilitation as a specialization.

Career
In 1953 he was one of the founding partners of the Southern California Permanente Medical Group and practiced in the Departments of Physical Medicine and Rehabilitation at the Kaiser Permanente Los Angeles and West Los Angeles Medical Centers.

Retirement
After his retirement in 1974, he served as a chairman of the Department of Physical Medicine and Rehabilitation at the University of Southern California. He was in private practice at Santa Monica Hospital for several years and was an emeritus professor of Physical Medicine and Rehabilitation at the David Geffen School of Medicine at UCLA at the time of his death.

Cailliet resided near Los Angeles, California.

Selected works
Whiplash-Associated Diseases. American Medical Association (2007) 
The Illustrated Guide to Functional Anatomy of the Musculoskeletal System. American Medical Association (2003) 
Pain: Mechanisms and Management. F.A. Davis & Co (1993) 
Knee Pain and Disability (Pain Series). F.A. Davis & Co (1992) 
Shoulder Pain (Pain Series). F.A. Davis & Co (1991) 
Neck and Arm Pain (Pain Series). F.A. Davis & Co (1991) 
Soft Tissue Pain and Disability (Pain Series). F.A. Davis & Co (1988) 
Low Back Syndrome. F.A. Davis & Co (1982) ASIN B000HF9AVI

References

2015 deaths
1917 births
Physicians from California
American people of French descent
David Geffen School of Medicine at UCLA faculty
Keck School of Medicine of USC alumni
20th-century physicians
American physicians
American textbook writers